This is an episode list of the British Radio comedy The Men from the Ministry. Dates shown are original air dates on initially the BBC Light Programme and later BBC Radio 4. The final (14th) series was originally recorded for distribution overseas and was not broadcast in the UK at the time.

1st Series 1962

with Wilfrid Hyde-White as "One" and Roy Dotrice as "Sir Gregory Pitkin" in this and second Series

  1.     1- 1     30-Oct-1962     The Great Footwear Scandal
  2.     1- 2      6-Nov-1962     The Big Rocket
  3.     1- 3     13-Nov-1962     Strictly for the Birds
  4.     1- 4     20-Nov-1962     French Cricket
  5.     1- 5     27-Nov-1962     The War with the Isle of Wight
  6.     1- 6      4-Dec-1962     Moderately Important Person
  7.     1- 7     11-Dec-1962     The Rhubarb Pirates
  8.     1- 8     18-Dec-1962     A Matter of Form
  9.     1- 9     25-Dec-1962     The Magic Carpet (missing - 2019)
 10.     1-10      1-Jan-1963     The Spy in Black and White
 11.     1-11      8-Jan-1963     Island in the Sun
 12.     1-12     15-Jan-1963     Problem in the Park (missing - 2019)
 13.     1-13     22-Jan-1963     The End of the Road (missing - 2019)

Christmas Special 1964
         S- 1     24-Dec-1964     A Present for Norman (missing - 2019)

2nd Series 1965

 14.     2- 1     25-Jul-1965     Pirates of Lakeview Reservoir (end missing - 2019)
 15.     2- 2      1-Aug-1965     Something about a Soldier
 16.     2- 3      8-Aug-1965     The Trouble with Cecil (end missing - 2019)
 17.     2- 4     15-Aug-1965     Mahboni Lies Over the Ocean (end missing - 2019)
 18.     2- 5     22-Aug-1965     The Man Who made it Rain (end missing - 2019)
 19.     2- 6     29-Aug-1965     Train of Events
 20.     2- 7      5-Sep-1965     Degrading Business
 21.     2- 8     12-Sep-1965     The Butcher of Glensporran (end missing - 2019)
 22.     2- 9     19-Sep-1965     Counter Spies (end missing - 2019)
 23.     2-10     26-Sep-1965     A Question of Dundancy 
 24.     2-11      3-Oct-1965     A Back-dated Problem	
 25.     2-12     10-Oct-1965     The Hole
 26.     2-13     17-Oct-1965     The Day the Martians Came (end missing - 2019)

3rd Series 1966/7
with Deryck Guyler as "One" and Ronald Baddiley as "Sir Gregory Pitkin" in this and all subsequent Series

 27.     3- 1     11-Dec-1966     Rebel in Regents Park (missing - 2019)
 28.     3- 2     18-Dec-1966     A Terrifying Weapon (end missing - 2019) 
 29.     3- 3     25-Dec-1966     The Post Office Pantomime
 30.     3- 4      1-Jan-1967     All at Sea
 31.     3- 5      8-Jan-1967     Bowler Hats and Machine Guns
 32.     3- 6     15-Jan-1967     On the Run
 33.     3- 7     22-Jan-1967     A Gift for Sir Gregory (end missing - 2019)
 34.     3- 8     29-Jan-1967     The Whitehall Circus (beg. & end missing - 2019)
 35.     3- 9      5-Feb-1967     Customs of the Country
 36.     3-10     12-Feb-1967     Getting the Bird (beg. & end missing - 2019)
 37.     3-11     19-Feb-1967     The Girl in the Case
 38.     3-12     26-Feb-1967     The Thing on the Beach	
 39.     3-13      5-Mar-1967     A Slight Case of Demolition
 40.     3-14     12-Mar-1967     The Fastest Ship in the World (end missing - 2019)

4th Series 1968

 41.     4- 1     12-Feb-1968     Battle of the River Thames
 42.     4- 2     25-Feb-1968     The Tubby Submarine
 43.     4- 3      3-Mar-1968     A Matter of Breeding
 44.     4- 4     10-Mar-1968     The Great Showbiz Fiasco
 45.     4- 5     17-Mar-1968     Up the Poll
 46.     4- 6     24-Mar-1968     Waterway to Go
 47.     4- 7     31-Mar-1968     Dam Nuisance (missing - 2019)
 48.     4- 8      7-Apr-1968     The Fastest Brolly in the West
 49.     4- 9     14-Apr-1968     Lamb takes a Gambol
 50.     4-10     21-Apr-1968     Four Men in a Wellington - featuring Kenneth Horne and Sam Costa
 51.     4-11     29-Apr-1968     Out of this World
 52.     4-12      5-May-1968     Muddlers in Law	
 53.     4-13     12-May-1968     What has four Wheels and flies? (end missing - 2019)

5th Series 1969

 54.     5- 1     25-Mar-1969     A Rotten System - featuring Joan Sanderson
 55.     5- 2      1-Apr-1969     A Brush With an Old Master (end missing - 2019)
 56.     5- 3      8-Apr-1969     All Play and No Work (end missing - 2019)
 57.     5- 4     15-Apr-1969     A Sticky Business
 58.     5- 5     22-Apr-1969     The Home-Brewed Non-Vintage Bomb (missing - 2019)
 59.     5- 6     29-Apr-1969     The Ship That Wagged Its Tail

6th Series 1970

 60.     6- 1     30-Jun-1970     Bye-bye Mildred
 61.     6- 2      7-Jul-1970     Bare Necessities - featuring Joan Sanderson	
 62.     6- 3     14-Jul-1970     Storm in a Tea Urn - featuring Patricia Hayes
 63.     6- 4     21-Jul-1970     The Moving Target
 64.     6- 5     28-Jul-1970     Oil Well that Ends Well
 65.     6- 6      4-Aug-1970     The Bigger the Better - featuring Clive Dunn
 66.     6- 7     11-Aug-1970     Trouble in the Air
 67.     6- 8     18-Aug-1970     Miss Chatterley's Lover - featuring John Laurie
 68.     6- 9     25-Aug-1970     The Pudding From Outer Space (missing - 2019)
 69.     6-10      1-Sep-1970     A Little of what you Fancy
 70.     6-11      8-Sep-1970     A Bird in the Hand
 71.     6-12     15-Sep-1970     Bringing the House Down
 72.     6-13     22-Sep-1970     Fair Exchange
 73.     6-14     29-Sep-1970     Bill Stickers is Innocent

7th Series 1971

 74.     7- 1     29-Jul-1971     Rolling In It
 75.     7- 2      5-Aug-1971     Lost In Space (a.k.a. Up, Up and Away) (missing - 2019)	
 76.     7- 3     12-Aug-1971     Thoroughly Modern Ministry
 77.     7- 4     19-Aug-1971     We All Make Mistakes
 78.     7- 5     26-Aug-1971     The Fool-Proof Fool
 79.     7- 6      2-Sep-1971     Rotten To the Corps (intro. missing)
 80.     7- 7      9-Sep-1971     Transatlantic Trouble
 81.     7- 8     16-Sep-1971     The Finger of Suspicion	
 82.     7- 9     23-Sep-1971     Just the Ticket

Special 1971
         S- 2     29-Nov-1971     Gone to Pot  (end missing - 2019)

8th Series 1972

 83.     8- 1     11-Jul-1972     The Conference Trick
 84.     8- 2     18-Jul-1972     The Night We Crept Into The Crypt
 85.     8- 3     25-Jul-1972     How Now Brown Cow?
 86.     8- 4      1-Aug-1972     Sorry, Wrong Number (end missing - 2019)
 87.     8- 5      8-Aug-1972     The Desk Job
 88.     8- 6     15-Aug-1972     Fowl Play
 89.     8- 7     22-Aug-1972     Something of Value
 90.     8- 8     29-Aug-1972     Taking Leave of their Census

9th Series 1973

 91.     9- 1      6-Mar-1973     That's my Pigeon
 92.     9- 2     13-Mar-1973     Don't Let them Needle You - featuring Joan Sanderson
 93.     9- 3     20-Mar-1973     Find the Lady
 94.     9- 4     27-Mar-1973     Bridge Under Troubled Waters
 95.     9- 5      3-Apr-1973     A Private Affair - featuring Clive Dunn
 96.     9- 6     10-Apr-1973     Food For Thought
 97.     9- 7     17-Apr-1973     Getting it Taped
 98.     9- 8     24-Apr-1973     Safe and Unsound
 99.     9- 9      1-May-1973     The Export Caper
 100.    9-10      8-May-1973     Flushed with Success
 101.    9-11     15-May-1973     Under the Weather
 102.    9-12     22-May-1973     Monkey Business
 103.    9-13     29-May-1973     Cheesed Off

10th Series 1974

 104.   10- 1     17-Jun-1974     Plane Madness
 105.   10- 2     24-Jun-1974     Vipers in the Bosom	
 106.   10- 3      1-Jul-1974     Great Guns (end missing - 2019)
 107.   10- 4      8-Jul-1974     I Want my Mummy
 108.   10- 5     15-Jul-1974     One Man's Meat
 109.   10- 6     22-Jul-1974     Ballet Nuisance (end missing - 2019)
 110.   10- 7     29-Jul-1974     Sky High
 111.   10- 8      5-Aug-1974     A Break for Sir Gregory (missing - 2019)
 112.   10- 9     12-Aug-1974     Health and Deficiency	
 113.   10-10     19-Aug-1974     Big Deal
 114.   10-11     26-Aug-1974     They Fry by Night
 115.   10-12      2-Sep-1974     In the Picture
 116.   10-13      9-Sep-1974     She'll Have to go

11th Series 1975

 117.   11- 1     26-May-1975     Nothing but the Vest
 118.   11- 2      2-Jun-1975     That's My Baby	
 119.   11- 3      9-Jun-1975     All that Glitters
 120.   11- 4     16-Jun-1975     Torn to Shreds
 121.   11- 5     23-Jun-1975     Wool Over Their Eyes	
 122.   11- 6     30-Jun-1975     This, VAT and the Other
 123.   11- 7      7-Jul-1975     The Great Trouser Troubles
 124.   11- 8     14-Jul-1975     The Cabinet Crisis
 125.   11- 9     21-Jul-1975     Chain Reaction
 126.   11-10     28-Jul-1975     All Change
 127.   11-11      4-Aug-1975     A Merry Dance
 128.   11-12     11-Aug-1975     A Sense of Power
 129.   11-13     18-Aug-1975     Postal Disorder

12th Series 1976

 130.   12- 1      6-Jul-1976     All Cisterns Go
 131.   12- 2     13-Jul-1976     A Problem Shared	
 132.   12- 3     20-Jul-1976     The Whitehall Castaways
 133.   12- 4     27-Jul-1976     Off the Rails
 134.   12- 5      3-Aug-1976     Penny Wise
 135.   12- 6     10-Aug-1976     A Turn For the Nurse	
 136.   12- 7     17-Aug-1976     Seal of Office
 137.   12- 8     24-Aug-1976     Birmingham is Revolting

13th Series 1977

 138.   13- 1      4-Jul-1977     Mission Inedible
 139.   13- 2     11-Jul-1977     Horse Play
 140.   13- 3     18-Jul-1977     The Big Big Big Ben Bungle
 141.   13- 4     25-Jul-1977     A Motley Crew
 142.   13- 5      1-Aug-1977     Not on Your Telly
 143.   13- 6      8-Aug-1977     One Way Only
 144.   13- 7     15-Aug-1977     Take Your Pick
 145.   13- 8     22-Aug-1977     Claws

14th Series 1980 - BBC Transcription Services Recordings

                  Transcription 
  Episode #      Recording Date   Episode Title           Re-recording of an earlier episode

 146.   14- 1     13-Apr-1980     Boots                   The Great Footwear Scandal
 147.   14- 2     13-Apr-1980     Pardon My French        French Cricket
 148.   14- 3     15-Apr-1980     Traffic Diversions      The End of the Road
 149.   14- 4     20-Apr-1980     Watch This Space        The Big Rocket
 150.   14- 5     20-Apr-1980     Birds of a Feather      Strictly for the Birds
 151.   14- 6     22-Apr-1980     Where There's a Will    Problem in the Park
 152.   14- 7     22-Apr-1980     The Country Caper       The Rhubarb Pirates
 153.   14- 8     27-Apr-1980     Ban The Wotsit          A Terrifying Weapon
 154.   14- 9     27-Apr-1980     A Testing Time          A Degrading Business
 155.   14-10     29-Apr-1980     Pushing the Vote Out    Up The Poll
 156.   14-11     29-Apr-1980     Gone To Earth           The Hole
 157.   14-12      6-May-1980     Computaclanger          The Trouble With Cecil
 158.   14-13      6-May-1980     A Great Convenience     A Slight Case Of Demolition
 159.   14-14     15-Apr-1980     The Christmas Spirit    The Magic Carpet

See also

References
 britishcomedy - The Men from the Ministry
 epguides.com entry
 Gary Schajer's page - Broadcast Schedule
 Episode Guide with descriptions on ComedySeries.info

Men From The Ministry